Mats Torsten Näslund (born 31 October 1959), nicknamed "Le Petit Viking", is a Swedish former ice hockey player. He played as a left winger. Despite his small size at only five feet and seven inches, Näslund is best known for being one of the top forwards with the National Hockey League's Montreal Canadiens in the 1980s. In addition to the Canadiens, Näslund played for Timrå IK, Brynäs IF, and Malmö IF of the Swedish Elite League, and HC Lugano of the National League A. He made a short NHL comeback attempt in 1995 with the Boston Bruins following a lockout, and retired after the season's conclusion.

In 1986, he won the Stanley Cup with the Canadiens, and he won the Lady Byng Trophy in 1988. He is a three-time Le Mat Trophy champion, once with Brynäs in 1980, and leading Malmö to its only championship wins in 1992 and 1994. Internationally, he won gold medals at the 1991 World Championship in Finland and the 1994 Winter Olympics in Lillehammer, making him a member of the prestigious Triple Gold Club.

NHL career
Näslund was selected in the second round as the 37th overall pick in the 1979 NHL Entry Draft, by the Montreal Canadiens. After playing for three more years in Sweden, he joined the Canadiens for the 1982–83 NHL season. He was the first European-born player to play for the Canadiens.

In his rookie season of 1982–83, Näslund scored 71 points in 74 games, becoming the Canadiens' third leading scorer behind Guy Lafleur and Ryan Walter, who had 76 and 75 points respectively. That year, he was recognized as the left winger on the NHL All-Rookie Team.

His offensive abilities quickly endeared him to Montreal fans, and he was given the nickname of "Le Petit Viking" (The Little Viking), a reference to his Nordic heritage and his short stature. Teammate Mario Tremblay jokingly said when Näslund arrived that the Habs only received half of a player and the other half would arrive later.

In the 1986 Stanley Cup playoffs, the speedy Näslund was Montreal's top point-getter (with 19), as the Canadiens won their twenty-third Stanley Cup, their first since 1979.

During his NHL career, Näslund was an infrequent visitor to the penalty box. Never logging more than 19 penalty minutes in any season during his career, his gentlemanly play was recognized when he was voted the winner of the  Lady Byng Memorial Trophy, beating Wayne Gretzky in the voting. During the 1988 NHL All-Star Game, his five assists established a record, and he was instrumental in helping Mario Lemieux set the All-Star Game record with six points.

After a sub-par  season, worn down by the relatively long NHL seasons, Näslund left the Canadiens to return to Europe. He played one year in Switzerland, followed by three seasons in his native Sweden. He returned to the NHL to play for the Boston Bruins in the lockout shortened  season, and retired from hockey thereafter.

Näslund ranks twelfth on the Canadiens all-time scoring list, with 612 points in 617 regular season games.

Despite both playing hockey, he is not related to Markus Näslund.

Career statistics

Regular season and playoffs

International

International career 

 

Näslund is one of Swedish hockey's all-time great players, and as such represented his country at numerous international tournaments.  As a junior, he represented Sweden at the 1978 and 1979 World Junior Hockey Championship, winning a silver medal in 1978 and a bronze medal the following year.

Näslund would go on to participate in five World Hockey Championships, winning a bronze in 1979, a silver in 1981 and a gold in 1991, his last appearance at the event.  Because the World Championships occur at the same time as the Stanley Cup playoffs, Näslund was often not available for the event during his best years in Montreal.  His sole appearance as an active NHL player came in 1983.

Näslund did get the chance to play for Sweden against the NHL's best players at the 1984, 1987 and 1991 Canada Cup, the forerunner to the World Cup.  The Swedes lost to Canada in the finals of the 1984 event.  They reached the semifinal game in both 1987 and 1991, losing to the USSR and Canada respectively.

Näslund also participated in two Winter Olympics, in 1980 and 1994.  Sweden won the bronze medal in 1980 and the gold medal in 1994, that year defeating Canada in a memorable shootout.  The gold medal in 1994 gave Näslund the distinction of having won the Stanley Cup, World Championship and Olympic Championship in his career, and (along with Håkan Loob and Tomas Jonsson) becoming the first member(s) of the Triple Gold Club.

As general manager for the Swedish national men's ice hockey team, Näslund helped construct the gold medal-winning team at the 2006 Winter Olympics.

Awards, honors and championships 
 World Junior Ice Hockey Championship All-Star Team, 1978
 Golden Puck (Swedish Player of the Year), 1980
 Swedish league champion, 1980, 1992, 1994
 NHL All-Rookie Team, 1983
 Played in NHL All-Star Game, 1984, 1986, 1988, 1989 (injured, did not play)
 Viking Award (for the best Swede in the NHL), 1985, 1986
 NHL Second All-Star Team, 1986
 Stanley Cup champion, 1986
 Lady Byng Trophy, 1988
 World Champion, 1991
 Olympic gold medal, 1994

References

External links
 

1959 births
Boston Bruins players
Brynäs IF players
HC Lugano players
Ice hockey players at the 1980 Winter Olympics
Ice hockey players at the 1992 Winter Olympics
Ice hockey players at the 1994 Winter Olympics
IIHF Hall of Fame inductees
Lady Byng Memorial Trophy winners
Living people
Malmö Redhawks players
Medalists at the 1980 Winter Olympics
Medalists at the 1994 Winter Olympics
Montreal Canadiens draft picks
Montreal Canadiens players
Olympic bronze medalists for Sweden
Olympic gold medalists for Sweden
Olympic ice hockey players of Sweden
Olympic medalists in ice hockey
People from Timrå Municipality
Stanley Cup champions
Swedish expatriate ice hockey players in Canada
Swedish expatriate sportspeople in Switzerland
Swedish expatriate ice hockey players in the United States
Swedish ice hockey left wingers
Timrå IK players
Triple Gold Club
Sportspeople from Västernorrland County
Expatriate ice hockey players in Switzerland